Ripatti is a Finnish surname. Notable people with the surname include:

 Pertti Ripatti (1930–2016), Finnish diplomat and lawyer
 Vladislav Delay (born 1976), real name Sasu Ripatti, Finnish electronic musician

Finnish-language surnames